The Federal Ministry for Labour and Social Affairs, abbreviated BMAS) is a federal ministry of the Federal Republic of Germany headed by the Federal Minister of Labour and Social Affairs as a member of the Cabinet of Germany (Bundesregierung). Its first location is on Wilhelmstrasse in Berlin, the second in Bonn.

History 

The Reich Ministry of Labour of the Weimar Republic was established on 13 February 1919 as the successor of the Labour Office (Reichsarbeitsamt) of the German Empire. The Social Democratic politician Gustav Bauer became the first Minister for Labour under Chancellor Philipp Scheidemann, whom he succeeded on 21 June that year. On the day of the Machtergreifung in January 1933, the German National politician and Der Stahlhelm leader Franz Seldte was appointed Minister for Labour in the Cabinet Hitler, a position he officially held until 1945, though without actual power.

The West German Ministry for Labour was re-established in Bonn on 20 September 1949 with the Cabinet Adenauer I. According to the 1991 Berlin/Bonn Act it moved to its present seat in Berlin-Mitte in 2000, on premises formerly used by Goebbels' Propaganda Ministry and the East German National Front organisation.

During the Cabinet Schröder II from 2002 to 2005, the ministry had been dissolved and its responsibilities allocated to the  Federal Ministry for Economics and Labour and the Federal Ministry of Health and Social Security. Responsibilities were re-allocated once again when a new government was formed under Chancellor Angela Merkel following the Bundestag elections of 2005. The German name was changed from Bundesministerium für Arbeit und Sozialordnung to Bundesministerium für Arbeit und Soziales.

Ministers

German Reich (until 1945) 

 Reich Ministers

Political Party:

|-
! colspan="8"| Weimar Republic (1919–1933)
|-

|-
! colspan="8"| Nazi Germany (1933–1945)
|-

Federal Republic of Germany (1949–present) 
 Federal Ministers
Political Party:

State secretaries 

The Parliamentary Secretary of States are Anette Kramme and Kerstin Griese.

The Secretaries of State are Leonie Gebers, Björn Böhning and Rolf Schmachtenberg.

Notes

External links 

 Official Web site

Labour And Social Affairs
Germany, Labour And Social Affairs
Germany, Labour And Social Affairs
Germany, Labour And Social Affairs
Germany, Labour And Social Affairs
German labour law